This is a list of former constituencies of the Uttarakhand Legislative Assembly, organised by date of abolition. It does not include constituencies which were merely renamed.

List of former constituencies

Constituencies abolished in 2001

Chamoli district and Rudraprayag district
 Badri–Kedar constituency replaced by Badrinath constituency in Chamoli district and, Kedarnath constituency and Rudraprayag constituency in Rudraprayag district

Uttarkashi district
 Uttarkashi constituency (SC) replaced by Gangotri constituency, Purola constituency (SC) and Yamunotri constituency in Uttarkashi district

Constituencies abolished in 2011

Almora district
 Bhikiyasain constituency

Bageshwar district
 Kanda constituency

Chamoli district
 Pindar constituency (SC) replaced by Tharali constituency (SC) in Chamoli district
 Nandaprayag constituency

Dehradun district
 Dehradun constituency replaced by Dehradun Cantonment constituency in Dehradun district 
 Lakshman Chowk constituency replaced by Dharampur constituency in Dehradun district 
 Rajpur constituency replaced by Rajpur Road constituency (SC) in Dehradun district

Haridwar district
 Bahadarabad constituency replaced by Jwalapur constituency (SC) in Haridwar district
 Iqbalpur constituency replaced by Piran Kaliyar constituency in Haridwar district
 Laldhang constituency replaced by Haridwar Rural constituency in Haridwar district
 Landhaura constituency (SC) replaced by Khanpur constituency in Haridwar district

Nainital district
 Dhari constituency
 Mukteshwar constituency (SC) replaced by Bhimtal constituency in Nainital district

Pauri Garhwal district
 Bironkhal constituency replaced by Chaubattakhal constituency in Pauri Garhwal district
 Dhumakot constituency
 Thalisain constituency

Pithoragarh district
 Kanalichhina constituency

Udham Singh Nagar district
 Pantnagar–Gadarpur constituency replaced with Gadarpur constituency
 Rudrapur–Kichha constituency replaced with Rudrapur constituency and Kichha constituency

Anglo-Indian reserved seat in the Uttarakhand Legislative Assembly
Between 2002 and 2020, one seat was reserved in the Uttarakhand Legislative Assembly for members of the Anglo-Indian community. The member was nominated by the Governor of Uttarakhand on the advice of the Government of Uttarakhand. In January 2020, the Anglo-Indian reserved seats in the Parliament and State Legislatures of India were abolished.

See also
List of constituencies of the Uttarakhand Legislative Assembly
List of former constituencies of the Lok Sabha

References

External links
ceo.uk.gov.in
gov.ua.nic.in
gov.ua.nic.in

Constituencies
Uttarakhand